Thimarafushi Airport is a domestic airport located on the island of Thimarafushi in Thaa Atoll, Maldives. It was constructed by the Maldives Transport and Contracting Company (MTCC); the first aeroplane to land at it did so in a test conducted on 2 September 2013. It was opened on 3 September 2013 by President Mohamed Waheed Hassan.

Airlines and destinations

See also
 List of airports in the Maldives
 List of airlines of the Maldives

References

Airports in the Maldives
Airports established in 2013